Joseph Faber MacDonald (born 1932 in Little Pond, Nova Scotia) was a Canadian clergyman and prelate for the Roman Catholic Diocese of Grand Falls. He was appointed bishop in 1980 in Grand Falls, and then 1998 in Saint John. He died in 2012.

References 

1932 births
2012 deaths
Canadian Roman Catholic bishops